Salah bin Ghanim Al-Ali (born 1966) is a Qatari politician and Qatari Minister of Youth and Sports.

Education 
Al-Ali studied Management Engineering at the University of the Pacific.

Career 
From 1998 to 2006, Al-Ali was appointed Vice Chairman of State Audit Bureau in Qatar and was then appointed as Chairman in 2006. 

In 2007, he was appointed to the Qatar National Committee for Integrity and Transparency as Chairman of ABQ.

Al-Ali was appointed Minister of Youth and Sports in June 2013. In February 2016, he became Minister of Culture and Sports. Al-Ali was appointed as Qatar's Minister of Sports and Youth in October 2021.

He is the chairman of Barwa Group, a listed business on the Qatar Stock Exchange.

References

External links
Ministry of Youth and Sports

twitter account https://twitter.com/salahbenghanim?s=11

Qatari politicians
Living people
Government ministers of Qatar
1966 births
People from Doha